
Year 425 BC was a year of the pre-Julian Roman calendar. At the time, it was known as the Year of the Tribunate of Atratinus, Medullinus, Cincinnatus and Barbatus (or, less frequently, year 329 Ab urbe condita). The denomination 425 BC for this year has been used since the early medieval period, when the Anno Domini calendar era became the prevalent method in Europe for naming years.

Events 
 By place 
 Persian Empire 
 Artaxerxes I, Achaemenid king of Persia, is succeeded by his son Xerxes II.   

 Greece 
 Demosthenes captures and fortifies the port of Pylos in the Peloponnesus, giving Athens a strong base close to Sparta. Meanwhile, a Spartan army, commanded by Brasidas, lands on the nearby island of Sphacteria, but is repulsed by the Athenians. An Athenian fleet summoned by Demosthenes bottles up the Spartan navy in Navarino Bay.
 Cleon joins Demosthenes in the invasion by Athenian troops of Sphacteria. The resulting Battle of Pylos results in an Athenian victory leading to the surrender of many of the Spartan troops. Pylos remains in Athenian hands, and is used as a base for raids into Spartan territory and as a refuge for fleeing Spartan helots.
 Following the failure of peace negotiations between Athens and Sparta, a number of Spartans stranded on the island of Sphacteria after the Battle of Pylos are attacked by an Athenian force under Cleon and Demosthenes. The resulting Battle of Sphacteria leads to a further victory by the Athenians over the Spartans. The Spartans sue for peace, but the Athenian leader Cleon persuades Athens to refuse.

 China 
 Zhou wei lie wang becomes King of the Zhou Dynasty of China.

 By topic 
 Architecture 
 Callicrates starts to build the Temple of Athena Nike on the Acropolis in Athens (approximate date). Between 410 and 407 BC the temple is surrounded by a parapet.

 Art 
 What some historians call the Rich style begins in Greece.

 Literature 
 Euripides' play Hecuba is performed.   
 Aristophanes' play The Acharnians is performed. Produced by Callistratus, it wins Aristophanes a first prize at the Lenaea.

Births 
 Artaxerxes III, king of the Persian Empire (approximate date)

Deaths 
 Artaxerxes I, king of the Persian Empire
 Herodotus of Halicarnassos, Dorian Greek historian (b. 484 BC)

References